The Seething Pot is a roman à clef written by George A. Birmingham, which negatively portrays various individuals and organizations of County Mayo. It was first published in 1905. The novel has been called an "excellent study of life in the west of Ireland."

A seething pot (also seethingpot or seething-pot) is a vessel for boiling provisions mentioned in the King James Bible at Job 41:20 and Jer. 1:13.

References

1905 novels
Irish political novels
Novels set in County Mayo
Roman à clef novels
20th-century Irish novels
1905 debut novels